Ian Bryant may refer to:

Ian Bryant (footballer) (born 1942), Australian rules footballer
Ian Bryant (academic) (born 1965), British academic